Mangelia melitensis is a species of sea snail, a marine gastropod mollusk in the family Mangeliidae.

Description
The length of the shell varies between 4 mm and 6.1 mm.

Distribution
This species occurs in the Mediterranean Sea off Malta.

References

External links
 

melitensis
Gastropods described in 2008